George Anthony Rensa (September 29, 1901 – January 4, 1987) was a Major League Baseball player. Rensa played for the New York Yankees, Detroit Tigers, Philadelphia Phillies and the Chicago White Sox. He batted and threw right-handed.

He was born in Parsons, Pennsylvania and died in Wilkes-Barre, Pennsylvania.

In 200 games over six seasons, Rensa posted a .261 batting average (134-for-514) with 71 runs, 7 home runs, 65 RBI and 57 bases on balls. Defensively, he recorded a .965 fielding percentage as a catcher.

External links

1901 births
1987 deaths
Major League Baseball catchers
New York Yankees players
Chicago White Sox players
Detroit Tigers players
Philadelphia Phillies players
Baseball players from Pennsylvania
Union City Greyhounds players
Crisfield Crabbers players